Josh Bates (born 1 February 1996) is a British speedway rider.

Early career
Born in Barnsley, Bates had never been on any type of motorbike until the beginning of 2010, when he got his first 125cc speedway bike. After a few months of practicing on this he was ready for a 250cc, which he got in June 2010. After a few more months of practice he entered the 2011 250cc British Championship, where he finished 4th overall. As well as competing in the British championship he rode in the amateur summer championship at Scunthorpe which he won and he also competed in the 250cc world championship in Sweden.

Career
In January 2012, he started riding a 500cc for the first time, soon after he was offered a team place by the Mildenhall Fen Tigers. He suffered a broken arm in a crash in August 2012, but made a successful return from injury and helped the Fen Tigers complete the National League "Grand Slam" that year.

In 2013 he was signed by Scunthorpe Scorpions to ride in the Premier League. In 2014, he won the British Under-21 Championship. 

He rode for both the Wolverhampton Wolves and the Sheffield Tigers in 2015 and Sheffield and Coventry Storm in 2016. He also won the British Under-21 Championship for a second time in 2016 and reached the final of the World U21 Championship. For the 2017 season he remained at Sheffield for the third season running and joined Leicester Lions.

His career suffered after a crash at Peterborough in 2019. He returned for the 2021 season as a reserve rider at Sheffield and a team rider for Leicester.

References

1996 births
English motorcycle racers
British speedway riders
Living people
Sportspeople from Barnsley
Coventry Bees riders
Leicester Lions riders
Mildenhall Fen Tigers riders
Sheffield Tigers riders
Scunthorpe Scorpions riders
Wolverhampton Wolves riders